Una Himachal railway station, code name "UHL", is an important and main station in Una district which is located near Regional Government Hospital on Una–Hamirpur Highway in Una City which is the first broad gauge of Himachal Pradesh.

The ISBT Una is 2 km from station. Auto rickshaws and cabs are available here all the time.

Una Himachal railway station is directly connected to the country's capital Delhi, and to Chandigarh.

Second-class waiting room, deluxe toilets, and water coolers, are available in the station. The station has two platforms and three rail tracks. Station is well rain sheltered. Rail tracks are electrified.

Trains

 22458/22457 Amb Andaura–Hazur Sahib Nanded Weekly Mail
 12058/12057 Una Himachal–New Delhi Jan Shatabdi Express
 14554/14553 Himachal Express
 19411/19412 Daulatpur Chowk– Sabarmati Express

Functional and proposed rail line

Himachal's first broad-gauge railway line, which was accepted in 1981–1982 general budget, from town Nagal dam in Punjab state via Una District of Himachal Pradesh to Talwara (Punjab),which has now been completed for 59 km long at Daulatpur Chowk in District Una.  the rest of  5 km formation in Himachal, it will re-enter Punjab. Further, it is also planned to connect Talwara with Mukerian city after joining  Mukerian city, it will be the second railway line to Jammu.

References

Railway stations in Una district
Ambala railway division
Transport in Una, Himachal Pradesh